Mariann Byerwalter is chairman of the board of directors for SRI International. Prior to this, Byerwalter served as chairman of the board of directors of Stanford Hospital and Clinics from 2006 to 2013. She also served as the Interim President and CEO of Stanford Health Care in 2016.

Byerwalter currently serves as a director on the following boards: Pacific Life Insurance Company, Franklin Resources, Inc., Redwood Trust, Inc., the Burlington Capital Group, Stanford Health Care (formerly Stanford Hospital and Clinics) and the Lucile Packard Children’s Hospital. She is a trustee emerita of the Stanford University board of trustees, having served three terms as a trustee between 1992 and 2012.

Education
Byerwalter received a bachelor's degree in economics and political science/public policy from Stanford University in 1982. She then received a master's degree in business administration (MBA) from Harvard Business School in 1984.

Career
Byerwalter was chief financial officer and vice president for business affairs of Stanford University from 1996 to 2000.  Prior to this she was a partner and co-founder of America First Financial Corporation, which raised funds to purchase and turn-around failed savings and loans from the government.  Before this she was vice president for strategic planning and corporate development at BankAmerica Corporation, managing acquisitions and divestitures for BankAmerica.

References

Living people
Year of birth missing (living people)
Directors of SRI International
Bank of America executives
Stanford University alumni
Stanford University trustees
Harvard Business School alumni
Women chief financial officers
American women chief executives
American chief financial officers
21st-century American women